Holcocera concolor is a moth in the family Blastobasidae. It is found from Massachusetts north to Nova Scotia and west to British Columbia.

The forewings are yellow orange.

Larvae have been reared from several Pinaceae species, including Pinus resinosa, Pinus rigida, Pinus strobus, Picea abies, Picea glauca and Larix species.

Etymology
The species is named for the uniform yellowish-orange colour of the forewings.

References

Moths described in 2003
concolor